John C. Revens Jr. is a former Democratic member of the Rhode Island Senate, representing the 31st District from 1990 to 2008.

Revens previously served from 1974 through 1988, serving as Majority Leader from 1983 through 1988. Prior to serving in the Senate, he was a member of the Rhode Island House of Representatives from 1969 through 1974.

External links
Rhode Island Senate – Senator John C. Revens Jr. official RI Senate website
Project Vote Smart – Senator John C. Revens Jr. (RI) profile
2006 2004 2002 2000 1998 1996 1994 campaign contributions
Attorney profile at Revens, Revens & St. Pierre

|-

Rhode Island state senators
Members of the Rhode Island House of Representatives
1947 births
Living people
Politicians from Providence, Rhode Island